John Sapcote may refer to:

 John Sapcote (MP for Ripon) in 1559
John Sapcote (MP for Huntingdonshire) represented Huntingdonshire in 1475